Diamanto Evripidou (born 30 March 2000) is a Cypriot female rhythmic gymnastics, representing her nation in international competitions. At the 2018 Commonwealth Games she won 6 medals, four golds in the team all-around, individual-all around, individual hoop and individual ball events, silver for the individual ribbon event and bronze for the individual clubs event.

References

2000 births
Living people
Cypriot rhythmic gymnasts
People from Nicosia District
Gymnasts at the 2018 Commonwealth Games
Commonwealth Games medallists in gymnastics
Commonwealth Games gold medallists for Cyprus
Commonwealth Games silver medallists for Cyprus
Commonwealth Games bronze medallists for Cyprus
Medallists at the 2018 Commonwealth Games